Air Vice-Marshal George Phillip Black,  (born 10 July 1932) is a retired Royal Air Force officer.

RAF career
Black was commissioned into the Royal Air Force in 1950. He became officer commanding No. 111 Squadron in 1964, Leader of the Lightning Display Team in 1965 and Commander of the Lightning Operational Conversion Unit in 1967. He went on to be officer commanding No. 5 Squadron in 1969, a member of the air plans directorate in the Ministry of Defence in 1971 and Station Commander at RAF Wildenrath in 1972. After that he became Commander of the Harrier Field Force at RAF Germany in 1972, Group Captain Operations at Headquarters No. 38 Group in 1974 and Group Captain Operations at Headquarters No. 11 Group in 1978. His last appointments were as Commander Allied Air Defence Sector One in 1980 and Deputy Chief of Staff (Operations) at Headquarters Allied Air Forces Central Europe in 1984 before retiring in 1987.

In February 1983 Black was appointed as the 18th Commandant of the Royal Observer Corps, an appointment he held until September 1984.

Career after the RAF
Between 1987 and 1992 Black was the senior defence advisor at Ferranti Defence Systems in Edinburgh, moving to an appointment as Director of Military Business for Marconi Electronic Business Systems from 1993 until 1999. He then spent a year as the Defence Advisor to the Sensor Division of British Aerospace, transferring to the BAe Systems Avionics division in 2000. Since 2000 Black has been the Defence Consultant for Selex. Black was elected a Fellow of the Institute of Management in 1977 and a Fellow of the Royal Aeronautics Society in 2000.

References

|-

Royal Air Force air marshals
People of the Royal Observer Corps
Living people
1932 births
People from Aberdeen
Companions of the Order of the Bath
Officers of the Order of the British Empire
Recipients of the Air Force Cross (United Kingdom)